Carl McCullough (born November 14, 1973) is a former American football running back.  He played college football at the University of Wisconsin–Madison. He played for the Badgers during the 1993, 1995, 1996, and 1997 seasons. During his college career, he wore jersey #13. He was a regular starter in 1995 and 1996 over Aaron Stecker, before being replaced by future Heisman Trophy winner, Ron Dayne in 1997. He was not selected in the National Football League Draft.  In 2000, McCullough played professionally for the Berlin Thunder and the Rhein Fire of NFL Europe.  In 10 games he rushed 11 times for 34 yards.

College statistics
 Career rushing: 469 Att, 2111 Yds, 4.5 Avg, 9 TD
 Career kick returns: 4 Ret, 65 Yds, 16.3 Avg, 0 TD
 Career passing: 0 Cmp, 1 Att, 0 Yds, 0 TD

External links
 Sports-Reference.com
 The Football Database

1973 births
Living people
American football running backs
Berlin Thunder players
Rhein Fire players
Wisconsin Badgers football players